Janet Newberry (born August 6, 1953) is an American former professional tennis player who was active in the 1970s. She is also known by her former married name Janet Newberry-Wright and Janet Wright. She reached the semifinals of the French Open in 1975 and 1977 and the final of the 1973 Wimbledon Championships mixed doubles.

Personal life
Janet Newberry is a stepdaughter of lawyer Edward A. Turville, a former Davis Cup Captain, President of the USTA and a founder of the Florida Lawn Tennis Association in 1949 who served as its first president for five years. Janet married Frank I. Wright, a horse trainer at Belmont Park, television horse racing commentator for CBS and ESPN and World War II veteran, in 1981 and went by the name Janet Newberry Wright. After Wright's death in 1991, she married Ralph Howe, the national grass court 60 & over singles champion, court tennis champion, Yale intercollegiate squash champion, North American singles squash champion, in 1991 and now is known as Janet Newberry Howe.

Career
In 1968, Newberry won the USLTA 16-and-under championship.

In 1974, she played for the Boston Lobsters of the World Team Tennis league. In 1975, she won the British Hardcourt Championship in Bournemouth, reached the semifinals of the French Open, and played for the United States Federation Cup team in doubles, partnering Julie Heldman.

In 1976, Newberry beat Martina Navratilova in the first round of the US Open 1–6, 6–4, 6–3.  Navratilova said, "I still consider that loss the worst of my career, at least in the way I responded to it on and off the court."  Newberry was reported as saying that she had never seen anyone so distraught, and she helped Navratilova calm down afterwards.

In 1977, Newberry won the Italian Open after defeating Renáta Tomanová in the final in straight sets, and reached the semifinals of the French Open.

In 1984, Newberry achieved her best Grand Slam women's doubles result, reaching the quarterfinals at Wimbledon partnering Renee Blount, losing to Kathy Jordan and Anne Smith 6–0, 6–1.

Newberry's highest world ranking was World No. 17.

Later
Newberry was manager of British women's national training. She later worked for the Women's Tennis Association.

In 2004, she opened an antique shop in St Petersburg, Florida based on her collection of tennis memorabilia.

WTA Tour finals

Singles (2 titles, 2 runners-up)

Doubles 3 (2-1)

Mixed doubles 1

References

External links
 
 

1953 births
Living people
American female tennis players
Sportspeople from St. Petersburg, Florida
Tennis players from Los Angeles
Tennis people from Florida
21st-century American women